Colin Barry Phipps (23 July 1934 – 10 January 2009) was a British petroleum geologist and chairman of several petroleum companies. From 1974 to 1979 he was a Labour Party Member of Parliament, but in the 1980s he joined the Social Democratic Party.

Early life and studies
Colin Barry Phipps was born in Britain on 23 July 1934 at Swansea.  He attended Townfield Elementary School in Hayes, Middlesex, then Acton County Grammar School, and the Bishop Gore School, Swansea.  From University College London he gained a BSc in Geology in 1955; and a PhD in Geology from the University of Birmingham in 1957.

Career

Parliament
He stood in the Walthamstow East by-election in March 1969, and lost decisively.

He served as Member of Parliament for Dudley West from February 1974 to 1979, when he stood down. His successes in the oil industry made him one of the more wealthy Labour MPs. He joined the Social Democratic Party in the 1980s, and unsuccessfully stood for election in Worcester at the 1983 general election, and Stafford in 1987.

Geology
From 1957 to 1964 Phipps worked with Shell in Venezuela, the Netherlands and the United States.

In 1964, well before North Sea oil was known about, he left Shell and became an independent geology consultant and in 1973 he founded Clyde Petroleum, which had many involvements in North Sea oil. While working with this company he was also an MP from 1974 to 1979. He became the company's chief executive from 1979 to 1983 and its chairman from 1983 to 1995.

From 1989 to 2002 Phipps was chairman of Greenwich Resources, a gold mining company. He was chairman of the English String Orchestra (and was also involved with the English Symphony Orchestra) and Falklands Conservation from 1990 to 1992.

In 1996 he founded Desire Petroleum, remaining chairman until his death in 2009.  Although Phipps had visited the Falkland Islands in 1975, he did not become hopeful about oil prospects in the area until 2004, when a seismic survey of the geology showed considerable quantities of oil.

Personal life
In 1965 he married Marion Lawrey, and they had two sons and two daughters.

Phipps died on 10 January 2009, in a Birmingham hospital.

He owned a  farm in Worcestershire.

See also
 Vince Cable

References
Times Guide to the House of Commons October 1974

External links
 Times obituary
 Telegraph obituary

News items
 Falklands oil in April 2007

1934 births
2009 deaths
Labour Party (UK) MPs for English constituencies
UK MPs 1974
UK MPs 1974–1979
Scientists from Swansea
People educated at Acton County Grammar School
People educated at Bishop Gore School
Alumni of University College London
Alumni of the University of Birmingham
Fellows of the Geological Society of London
British petroleum geologists
Deaths from pancreatic cancer
People in the petroleum industry
Social Democratic Party (UK) parliamentary candidates